Erriapus , or Saturn XXVIII (28), is a prograde irregular satellite of Saturn. It was discovered by Brett Gladman, John J. Kavelaars and colleagues in 2000, and given the temporary designation S/2000 S 10. It was named Erriapo in August 2003 after Erriapus (also rendered Erriappus), a giant in Gaulish mythology; the name was changed from dative Erriapo to nominative Erriapus per IAU conventions in late 2007. 

Erriapus is about 10 kilometres in diameter, and orbits Saturn at an average distance of 17.3 Gm in 871 days.

As a member of the Gallic group of irregular satellites, which share similar orbital characteristics and a light-red colour, Erriapus is hypothesized to have its origin in the break-up of a common progenitor of the group, or to be a fragment of its largest member, Albiorix.

References 

Ephemeris from IAU-MPC NSES

External links
David Jewitt pages

Gallic group
Moons of Saturn
Irregular satellites
Astronomical objects discovered in 2000
Moons with a prograde orbit